Rifat Maratovich Zhemaletdinov (born 20 September 1996) is a Russian professional football player of Tatar origin who plays as a right winger or attacking midfielder for Lokomotiv Moscow.

Club career
He was first called up to FC Lokomotiv Moscow senior squad in September 2015 for a Russian Cup game against FC Torpedo Vladimir. He made his Russian Premier League debut for Lokomotiv on 30 April 2016 in a game against FC Spartak Moscow.

On 21 May 2021, he extended his contract with Lokomotiv until 2024.

International career
He won the 2013 UEFA European Under-17 Championship with Russia national under-17 football team, scoring a goal in the first group game against Ukraine. He also participated in 2013 FIFA U-17 World Cup with that team. Later he represented the Russia national under-19 football team in the 2015 UEFA European Under-19 Championship, in which Russia was the runner-up to Spain.

He was called up to the Russia national football team for the first time for UEFA Euro 2020 qualifying matches against Scotland and Cyprus, on 10 and 13 October 2019.

He made his debut for the senior team on 24 March 2021 in a 2022 FIFA World Cup qualifier against Malta.

On 11 May 2021, he was included in the preliminary extended 30-man squad for UEFA Euro 2020. On 2 June 2021, he was included in the final squad. He appeared in Russia's second game against Finland on 16 June as a second-half substitute in a 1–0 victory. He again appeared as a substitute for the last half-hour of the match on 21 June in the last group game against Denmark as Russia lost 1–4 and was eliminated.

He scored his first international goal on 4 September 2021 in a World Cup qualifier against Cyprus, establishing the final score in a 2–0 away victory.

Honours

Club
Lokomotiv Moscow
Russian Cup: 2018–19, 2020–21
Russian Super Cup: 2019

National
Russia U17
UEFA European Under-17 Championship: 2013
Russia U19
UEFA European Under-19 Championship runner-up: 2015

Career statistics

Club

International

International goals

Scores and results list Russia's goal tally first.

References

External links
 

1996 births
Footballers from Moscow
Living people
Tatar people of Russia
Tatar sportspeople
Russian footballers
FC Lokomotiv Moscow players
Russian Premier League players
FC Rubin Kazan players
Russia youth international footballers
Russia under-21 international footballers
Russia international footballers
UEFA Euro 2020 players
Association football forwards
Russian Muslims